Tõnu Kark (born on 4 December 1947 in Tallinn) is an Estonian actor. His older brother is actor and caricaturist Feliks Kark.

Notable roles
Notable film roles:

 Nest of Winds (1979)
 Metskannikesed (1980)
 Nukitsamees (1981)
 Äratus (1989)
 Firewater (1994)
 Screwed in Tallinn (1999)
 Good Hands (2001)
 Lilya 4-ever (2002)
 Waterbomb for the Fat Tomcat (2004)
  The Power of Fear (2006)
 Lotte from Gadgetville (2006)
 The Visit of the Old Lady (2006)
 Georg (2007)
 December Heat (2008)
 Devil Incarnate (2008)
 Circulation of the Blood (2011)
 Lotte and the Moonstone Secret (2011)
 Rat Trap (2011)
 Family Lies (2016)
 Green Cats (2017)
 The Dissidents (2017)
 Johannes Pääsukese tegelik elu (2019)
 Christmas In The Jungle (2020)

References

External links

1947 births
Living people
Estonian male stage actors
Estonian male film actors
Estonian male television actors
20th-century Estonian male actors
21st-century Estonian male actors
Recipients of the Order of the White Star, 3rd Class
Male actors from Tallinn